TRNA(m1G9/m1A9)-methyltransferase may refer to:
 TRNA (adenine9-N1)-methyltransferase
 TRNA (guanine9-N1)-methyltransferase